Kimberley Noakes (now Archibald; born 3 October 1982) is a New Zealand field hockey player who competed in the 2008 Summer Olympics. Noakes was born in Auckland.

References

External links
 

1982 births
Living people
New Zealand female field hockey players
Olympic field hockey players of New Zealand
Field hockey players at the 2008 Summer Olympics
People educated at St Cuthbert's College, Auckland
21st-century New Zealand women